Hélio Leite da Silva (born 9 December 1956) is a Brazilian politician and businessman. Born in Castanhal, he has served in the city council, deputy mayor and mayor, as well as state representative since 2015 for Pará.

Political career
Leite voted in favor of the impeachment against then-president Dilma Rousseff and political reformation. Leite would later back Rousseff's successor Michel Temer against a similar corruption investigation and impeachment motion. Leite voted in favor of 2017 Brazil labor reform.

In September 2018 Conselho Indigenista Missionário (Indian Missionary Council), an activists branch of the Catholic church for indigenous people of Brazil, named 50 Brazilian politicians who had done the most to weaken the rights of indigenous people in Brazil, of which Leite was included in.

References

1956 births
Living people
People from Pará
Democrats (Brazil) politicians
Liberal Party (Brazil, 2006) politicians
Brazilian Democratic Movement politicians
Members of the Chamber of Deputies (Brazil) from Pará
Members of the Legislative Assembly of Pará
Mayors of places in Brazil
People from Castanhal